Derek Dainard (born 1997 May 30) is a Micronesian swimmer. He competed in the 50 m freestyle and 50 m butterfly events at the 2013 World Aquatics Championships.

References

Living people
Federated States of Micronesia male swimmers
Swimmers at the 2014 Summer Youth Olympics
1997 births
2013 World Aquatics Championships